Silja Lehtinen (born 5 November 1985 in Helsinki) is a Finnish sailor. Lehtinen studies medicine at the University of Helsinki.

Silja Lehtinen has sailed in two Olympic regattas. In 2008, at the age of 23, she skippered the Finnish team in the Yngling class to an 11th place. In 2012, she participated in Women's Match Race (Elliott 6m) and won a bronze medal with her crew, Silja Kanerva and Mikaela Wulff.

In 2012 as well, only a month before the Olympic regatta, Lehtinen and her crew won match race world championship title in Gothenburg, Sweden.

Her brother Lauri skippered the Finnish 49er into seventh place at the 2012 Olympic regatta.

As a 15 year old, she won the Byte class World Championship in 2001.

References

External links
 
 
 

1985 births
Living people
Finnish female sailors (sport)
Olympic sailors of Finland
Sailors at the 2008 Summer Olympics – Yngling
Sailors at the 2012 Summer Olympics – Elliott 6m
Olympic bronze medalists for Finland
Olympic medalists in sailing
Sportspeople from Helsinki
Medalists at the 2012 Summer Olympics
29er class world champions
World champions in sailing for Finland